— From Cantos 27 and 56, In Memoriam A.H.H., by Alfred Tennyson, published this year

Nationality words link to articles with information on the nation's poetry or literature (for instance, Irish or France).

Events
 May (late) – Alfred Tennyson's poem In Memoriam A.H.H., written to commemorate the death of his friend and fellow poet Arthur Hallam in 1833, is published by Edward Moxon in London; on June 1 the writer's anonymity is broken by The Publishers' Circular
 June 13 – Alfred Tennyson marries his childhood friend Emily Sellwood at Shiplake
 July – William Wordsworth's The Prelude; or, Growth of a Poet's Mind: An Autobiographical Poem, on which he has worked since 1798, is first published about 3 months after his death by Edward Moxon in London in 14 books, with the title supplied by the poet's widow, Mary; originally intended to form the introduction to The Recluse, for which The Excursion (1814) formed the second part; though The Prelude failed to arouse great interest at this time, it is later generally recognised as his masterpiece (second edition 1851; see also "Events" for 1798, 1799, 1806, 1820, The Recluse 1888)
 November – A new edition of Elizabeth Barrett Browning's Poems is published by Chapman & Hall in London, including (in vol. 2) her Sonnets from the Portuguese (written during her courtship by Robert Browning c.1845–46) of which the most famous will be no. 43 ("How do I love thee? Let me count the ways.") (Sonnets first printed separately in Boston 1866; see also Poems 1844, 1853, 1856)
 November 19 – Alfred Tennyson succeeds Wordsworth as Poet Laureate of the United Kingdom after Samuel Rogers turns down the post, saying he is too old for it and Tennyson is assured that birthday odes will not be required of him
 Golden Age of Russian Poetry, begun in about 1800 ends at about this time
 Young Germany (Junges Deutschland) a loose group of German writers from about 1830, stops flourishing at about this time

Works published in English

United Kingdom
 William Allingham, Poems
 Philip James Bailey, The Angel World, and Other Poems
 Thomas Lovell Beddoes, published anonymously, Death's Jest-Book; or, The Fool's Tragedy (posthumous)
 Elizabeth Barrett Browning, Poems including Sonnets from the Portuguese
 Robert Browning, Christmas-Eve and Easter-Day
 Sydney Dobell, writing under the pen name "Sydney Yendys", The Roman
 Elin Evans, writing under the pen name "Elen Egryn", Telyn Egryn ("Egryn's Harp", Welsh)
 Dora Greenwell, Stories That Might Be True, with Other Poems
 Leigh Hunt, The Autobiography of Leigh Hunt in three volumes
 Dante Gabriel Rossetti, The Blessed Damozel in The Gem
 John Ruskin, Poems
 Robert Southey, Southey's Common-place Book: Third/Fourth Series, poems and prose, edited by John Wood Warner (see also first and second series 1849)
 Alfred Tennyson:
 In Memoriam A.H.H.
 "Ring Out, Wild Bells"
 William Wordsworth, posthumously, The Prelude

United States
 Washington Allston, Lectures on Art and Poems, (scholarship)
 George Copway, The Ojibway Conquest (the author also published this year the nonfiction work, Traditional History of the Ojibway Nation)
 Richard Henry Dana, Sr., Poems and Prose Writings, in two volumes, Volume 1 contains poems, both new and previously published in 1827, New York: Baker and Scribner
 Sylvester Judd, Philo, An Evangeliad
 Henry Wadsworth Longfellow, The Seaside and the Fireside
 Edgar Allan Poe, The Works of the Late Edgar Allan Poe: With a Memoir by Rufus Wilmot Griswold and Notices of His Life and Genius by N. P. Willis and J. R. Lowell, published in four volumes from this year to 1854 including "The Poetic Principle", an essay; criticism (published posthumously; died 1849)
 John Godfrey Saxe, Humorous and Satirical Poems
 William Gilmore Simms, The City of the Silent
 John Greenleaf Whittier:
 Poems, Boston: Benjamin B. Mussey & Co.
 Songs of Labor and Other Poems

Works published in other languages
 James Huston, editor, Le répertoire national, anthology of French Canadian poetry in four volumes, published from 1848 to this year; including poetry by Joseph Mermet ("Les Boucheries: fêtes rurales du Canada"), Isidore Bédard ("Sol canadien, terre chérie"), François-Xavier Garneau, Napoléon Aubin, François-Magloire Derome and Pierre Chauveau
 Brian Mac Giolla Meidhre (d. 1805), Cúirt An Mheán Oíche, Irish
 Andreas Munch, Nye Digte, Norwegian
 Betty Paoli, Neve Gedichte ("New Poems"), Austrian

Births
Death years link to the corresponding "[year] in poetry" article:
 January 15 – Mihai Eminescu (died 1889), Romanian
 February 20 – Nérée Beauchemin (died 1931), Canadian poet and physician
 June 27 – Ivan Vazov (died 1921), Bulgarian
 July 1 – Florence Van Leer Earle Coates (died 1927), American
 July 18 – Rose Hartwick Thorpe (died 1939), American
 September 2 – Eugene Field (died 1895), American
 November 5 – Ella Wheeler Wilcox (died 1919), American
 November 13 – Robert Louis Stevenson (died 1894), Scots novelist, poet, essayist and travel writer
 December 13 – William Chapman (died 1917), Canadian poet, journalist and bureaucrat
 December 25 – Isabella Valancy Crawford (died 1887), Irish-born Canadian poet
Also:
 Saul Adadi (died 1918), Libyan Sephardi Jewish hakham, rosh yeshiva and writer of piyyutim
 Hortensia Antommarchi (died 1915), Colombian poet
 Vitthal Bhagwani Lembhe (died 1920), Indian, Marathi-language poet
 Savitagauri Pandya (died 1925), Indian, Gujarati-language woman poet
 Vishvanatha Dev Varma, (died 1920), Indian, Sanskrit-language poet

Deaths

Birth years link to the corresponding "[year] in poetry" article:
 January 20 – Adam Oehlenschlager (born 1779), Danish
 January 20 – Philip Pendleton Cooke (born 1816), American lawyer and poet
 April 7 – William Lisle Bowles (born 1762), English
 April 23 – William Wordsworth (born 1770), English
 May 23 – Margaret Fuller (born 1810), American
 May 31 – Giuseppe Giusti (born 1809), Italian (Tuscan)
 August 22 – Nikolaus Lenau (born 1802), Austrian
Also:
 Manoah Bodman (born 1765), American

See also
 19th century in poetry
 19th century in literature
 List of years in poetry
 List of years in literature
 Victorian literature
 French literature of the 19th century
 List of poets

 Poetry
 List of poetry awards

Notes

19th-century poetry
Poetry